Zunn Mureed or Zann Mureed (lit: Uxorious) is a 2018 Pakistani drama serial that premiered on 2 March 2018 on Hum TV. It is directed by Ahmed Kamran and written by Amna Mufti. It stars Nadia Khan and Omair Rana in lead roles. The serial is produced by Momina Duraid under their production company MD Productions.

It is currently airing on Hum Pashto 1 under the same title.

Cast
Nadia Khan as Tabassum 
Omair Rana as Sajjad
Hina Khawaja Bayat as Maryam
Kashif Mehmood
Ayesha Gul
Sami Khan Jr. as Bobby (Child star)
Javeria as Bobby's sister (Child star) 
Khalid Anam as Khalid
Shamim Hilaly as Amma

Soundtrack

The title song was sung by Sahir Ali Bagga and Beena Khan. The music was composed by Sahir Ali Bagga and the lyrics were written by Ali Zaryoun

References

Pakistani drama television series
2018 Pakistani television series debuts
2018 Pakistani television series endings
Urdu-language television shows
Hum TV original programming